The Penitente River is a river located in southern Patagonia. The river originates in Chile in the south and flows north into Argentina. Somewhere in Argentina the river becomes the origin of the Gallegos River, but sources disagree whether this happens at the confluence of it with the Rubens River or with the Turbio River.

References 

Rivers of Argentina
Rivers of Chile
Rivers of Magallanes Region
International rivers of South America
Rivers of Santa Cruz Province, Argentina